Cristian Fernández may refer to:
 Cristian Fernández (Argentine footballer) (born 1979)
 Cristian Fernández (Spanish footballer) (born 1988)